Bertrand Meyer (born 21 November 1950) is a French academic, author, and consultant in the field of computer languages. He created the Eiffel programming language and the idea of design by contract.

Education and academic career
Meyer received a master's degree in engineering from the École Polytechnique in Paris, a second master's degree from Stanford University, and a PhD from the Université de Nancy. He had a technical and managerial career for nine years at Électricité de France, and for three years was a member of the faculty of the University of California, Santa Barbara.

From 2001 to 2016, he was professor of software engineering at ETH Zürich, the Swiss Federal Institute of Technology, where he pursued research on building trusted components (reusable software elements) with a guaranteed level of quality. He was Chair of the ETH Computer Science department from 2004 to 2006 and for 13 years (2003–2015) taught the Introduction to Programming course taken by all ETH computer science students, resulting in a widely disseminated programming textbook, Touch of Class (Springer).

He remains Professor emeritus of Software Engineering at ETH Zurich and is currently Professor of Software Engineering and Provost at the Schaffhausen Institute of Technology (SIT), a new research university in Schaffhausen, Switzerland.

He has held visiting positions at the University of Toulouse (Chair of Excellence, 2015–16), Politecnico di Milano, Innopolis University, Monash University and University of Technology Sydney. He is also active as a consultant (object-oriented system design, architectural reviews, technology assessment), trainer in object technology and other software topics, and conference speaker. For many years Meyer has been active in issues of research and education policy and was the founding president (2006–2011) of Informatics Europe, the association of European computer science departments.

Computer languages
Meyer pursues the ideal of simple, elegant and user-friendly computer languages and is one of the earliest and most vocal proponents of object-oriented programming (OOP). His book Object-Oriented Software Construction is one of the earliest and most comprehensive works presenting the case for OOP. Other books he has written include Eiffel: The Language (a description of the Eiffel language), Object Success (a discussion of object technology for managers), Reusable Software (a discussion of reuse issues and solutions), Introduction to the Theory of Programming Languages, Touch of Class (an introduction to programming and software engineering) and Agile! The Good, the Hype and the Ugly (a tutorial and critical analysis of agile methods). He has authored numerous articles and edited over 60 conference proceedings, many of them in the Springer LNCS (Lecture Notes in Computer Science) series.

He is the initial designer of the Eiffel method and language and has continued to participate in its evolution, and is the originator of the Design by Contract development method.

His experiences with object technology through the Simula language, as well as early work on abstract data types and formal specification (including the Z notation), provided some of the background for the development of Eiffel.

Contributions

Meyer is known among other contributions for the following:
 The concept of Design by Contract, highly influential as a design and programming methodology concept and a language mechanism present in such languages as the Java Modeling Language, Spec#, the UML's Object Constraint Language and Microsoft's Code Contracts.
 The design of the Eiffel language, applicable to programming as well as design and requirements.
 The early publication (in the first, 1988 edition of his Object-Oriented Software Construction book) of such widely used design patterns as the command pattern (the basis for undo-redo mechanisms, i.e. CTRL-Z/CTRL-Y, in interactive systems) and the bridge pattern.
 The original design (in collaboration with Jean-Raymond Abrial and Steven Schuman) of the Z specification language.
 His establishment of the connection between object-oriented programming and the concept of software reusability (in his 1987 paper ``Reusability: the Case for Object-Oriented Design''.
 His critical analysis of the pros and cons of agile development and his development of software lifecycle and management models.

Awards
Meyer is a member of Academia Europaea and the French Academy of Technologies and a Fellow of the ACM. He has received honorary doctorates from ITMO University in Saint Petersburg, Russia (2004) and the University of York, UK (2015).

He was the first "senior award" winner of the AITO Dahl-Nygaard award in 2005. This prize, named after the two founders of object-oriented programming, is awarded annually to a senior and a junior researcher who has made significant technical contributions to the field of OOP.

He is the 2009 recipient of the IEEE Computer Society Harlan Mills award.

In 2006, Meyer received the Software System Award of the ACM for "impact on software quality" in recognition of the design of Eiffel.

Wikipedia hoax

On 28 December 2005, an anonymous user falsely announced Meyer's death on the German Wikipedia's biography of Meyer. The hoax was reported five days later by the Heise News Ticker and the article was immediately corrected. Many major news media outlets in Germany and Switzerland picked up the story. Meyer went on to publish a positive evaluation of Wikipedia, concluding "The system succumbed to one of its potential flaws, and quickly healed itself. This doesn't affect the big picture. Just like those about me, rumors about Wikipedia's downfall have been grossly exaggerated."

See also
Open–closed principle
Uniform access principle
John Seigenthaler  - another victim of vandalism on Wikipedia.

References

External links

Bertrand Meyer home page

1950 births
Living people
École Polytechnique alumni
Academic staff of ETH Zurich
Formal methods people
Academic staff of Monash University
French computer scientists
Software engineering researchers
Programming language designers
Programming language researchers
Stanford University alumni
University of California, Santa Barbara faculty
Fellows of the Association for Computing Machinery
Members of Academia Europaea
Computer science writers
Nancy-Université alumni
Dahl–Nygaard Prize